Burr Folks (June 27, 1915 – January 9, 2000) was an American canoeist who competed in the 1936 Summer Olympics.

He was born in Schenectady, New York and died in Hasbrouck Heights, New Jersey.

In 1936 he finished tenth in the folding K-1 10000 m event while being eliminated in the heats of the K-2 1000 m event.

References
Sports-reference.com profile

1915 births
2000 deaths
American male canoeists
Canoeists at the 1936 Summer Olympics
Olympic canoeists of the United States